Makarov is a coastal town and the administrative center of Makarovsky District of Sakhalin Oblast, Russia, located on the eastern coast of the Sakhalin Island,  north of Yuzhno-Sakhalinsk. Population:

History
It was founded in 1892. It was called Shiritoru in 1905–1945 when the southern part of Sakhalin belonged to Japan. It was renamed Makarov (after the Russian admiral Stepan Makarov) and granted town status in 1946.

Administrative and municipal status
Within the framework of administrative divisions, Makarov serves as the administrative center of Makarovsky District and is subordinated to it. As a municipal division, the town of Makarov and ten rural localities of Makarovsky District are incorporated as Makarovsky Urban Okrug.

References

Notes

Sources

Cities and towns in Sakhalin Oblast
Populated coastal places in Russia